Lenka Dusilová (born 28 December 1975) is a Czech singer-songwriter and multiple-Anděl Award winner.

Career

Early years: 1988–2000
Dusilová began her career in 1988, joining the Bambini di Praga children's choir at age thirteen after singing in the family band RSP with her mother and brother. RSP played folk music set to Czech and Polish poetry. During the 1990s, Dusilová was a full and guest member of several groups.

Between 1991 and 1995, she led the rock band Sluníčko, which released an eponymous album in 1994, won the Marlboro Rock '94 competition, and opened the Open Air Gampell music festival in Switzerland. That year, Dusilová was nominated for the Discovery of the Year Anděl Award.

Between 1994 and 1997, the artist was a guest member of the rock band Lucie. In 1996, she formed the group Pusa with Lucie members David Koller and Marek Minárik. Their song "Muka" was nominated for an Anděl Award in 1996.

First three solo albums: 2000–2004
Dusilová won the Anděl Award for Female Singer of the Year in 2000 and the same year, she sang guest vocals on the Čechomor album Proměny, which was produced by Jaz Coleman and also featured David Koller on guest drums. The album's title track won an Anděl Award in 2001 for Song of the Year, while the record won Album of the Year. Also in 2000, she released her debut solo album, titled Lenka Dusilová. She followed it with Spatřit světlo světa in 2002 and UnEarthEd in 2004. This release was her first to be published in the United States.

Mezi Světy and Eternal Seekers: 2005–2008

Dusilová's 2005 album, Mezi Světy, went Gold within weeks of its release. It won the 2006 Anděl Award for Best Rock Album, and the musician received the award for Best Female Singer. The record was produced in the United States and featured Scott Amendola on drums, among other American session musicians.

In 2008, together with Beata Hlavenková and Clarinet Factory, Dusilová launched a project called Eternal Seekers. They recorded a self-titled album the same year, for which Dusilová won an Anděl Award in the Best Singer category. The track "Smiluje" was used as the opening song for the 2011 film Long Live the Family! by Robert Sedláček.

Subsequent albums and projects: 2011–present
In 2011, Dusilová released her fifth solo studio album, titled Baromantika. She went on to form a group of the same name, which also included Eternal Seekers bandmate Beata Hlavenková. In 2013, they released the live album Live at Café v lese and followed up in 2014 with the studio recording V hodině smrti.

In 2020, Dusilová released her sixth studio album, Řeka.

Discography

Solo

 Lenka Dusilová (2000)
 Spatřit světlo světa (2002)
 UnEarthEd (2004)
 Mezi světy (2005)
 Mezi světy US version (2006)
 Baromantika (2011)
 Řeka (2020)

Other albums
 Sluníčko with Sluníčko (1994)
 Pusa with Pusa (1996)
 Eternal Seekers, with Clarinet Factory and Beata Hlavenková (2008)
 Live at Café v lese with Baromantika (2013)
 V hodině smrti with Baromantika (2014)

Guest appearances
 Déva by Dušan Vozáry (1993)
 Lorien by Lorien (1993)
 Černý kočky, mokrý žáby by Lucie (1996)
 Meky by Miroslav Žbirka (1997)
 Smrtihlav by Daniel Landa (1998)
 Čechomor by Čechomor (2000)
 Proměny by Čechomor (2002)
 Čechomor Live by Čechomor (2002)
 Proměny Tour 2003 by Čechomor (2003)
 Co sa stalo nové by Čechomor (2005)
 Rande s panem Bendou by Wohnout (2006)
 Live u Staré Paní by Vertigo quintet (2006)
 Dívčí válka by Jan Burian (2006)
 Muži jsou křehcí by Jan Burian (2007)
 Polib si dědu by Wohnout (2007)
 Bob America by Bob America (2007)
 Michal Pavlíček a Beatová síň slávy by Michal Pavlíček (2007)
 Bílá velryba by Michal Hrůza (2007)
 Dirty Movie Music by MED (2008)
 Joy for Joel by Beata Hlavenková (2009)
 Miu Miu by Květy (2010)
 Ty Lidi by Jaryn Janek (2011)
 V čajové konvici by Květy (2011)
 Dobrý časy by Václav Neckář (2012)

Awards and nominations

References

External links

 

1975 births
Living people
21st-century Czech women singers
Musicians from Karlovy Vary